Saleha binti Abdul Rashid (born 24 July 1937), better known by her pen name Salmi Manja, is a Malaysian novelist, poet, and journalist. She was among the first Malaysian professional women writers and best known for her 1960 novel Hari Mana Bulan Mana (What Day What Month). Femininity, women's issues, and Islam are recurring themes in her work.

Biography
Salmi went to Darul Maarif Arab-language school and Tong Chai English School in Singapore. In 1956, Salmi attended a writing course offered by the Malay writer Harun Aminurrashid and became a member of the ASAS 50 group along with Usman Awang.

Before her career as a journalist and writer, Salmi worked as a religious teacher in her former school Darul Maarif during which time she contributed works of poetry to a number of local magazines. Salmi later became a journalist for Semenanjung and Berita Harian.

In April 1958, Salmi married the noted novelist and poet A. Samad Said and moved from Singapore to join him in Kuala Lumpur. Throughout the 1960s and 1970s, she published five other novels and two anthologies of short stories and poems. She continued her career as a journalist, working with Cahaya Lembaga and the Selangor Islamic Women's Association.

Selected works

Novels
 Hari Mana Bulan Mana (What Day What Month, 1960)
 Sayang Ustazah Sayang (A Pity, Ustazah, a Pity)

Collection of short stories
Daun-daun Berguguran (Fallen Leaves)

See also
Adibah Amin
Dina Zaman
Fatimah Busu
Khadijah Hashim
Siti Zainon Ismail

References

1937 births
Living people
Malaysian novelists
20th-century Malaysian poets
Malaysian women novelists
Malaysian women poets
Malaysian people of Malay descent
20th-century novelists
21st-century novelists
21st-century Malaysian poets
20th-century Malaysian women writers
21st-century Malaysian women writers